BSF may refer to:

Organisations
 Ballerup-Skovlunde Fodbold, a Danish football club
 British Skin Foundation, a UK charity raising money for skin disease and skin cancer research
 Bibliothèques Sans Frontières, an international non profit
 Bible Study Fellowship, an international Christian organisation 
 United States – Israel Binational Science Foundation
 Biosciences Federation, a UK life science organisation
 Border Security Force, Indian government paramilitary force 
 Brandy Station Foundation, an organization devoted to preserving a battle site in Virginia, United States
 British Softball Federation, the National Governing Body of softball within the UK
 Bund Schweizerischer Frauenvereine, Swiss national federation of women's organizations

Science
 Basilar skull fracture, a head injury
 Biosand filter, water filtration technique
 Black Soldier Fly, a larva used in permaculture

Computing
 Bean Scripting Framework, software to integrate the Java programming language with other scripting languages
 Bit Scan Forward, an x86 instruction used to find the least significant bit set in a binary word
 Bootstrapping Server Function part of GAA/GBA Generic Bootstrapping Architecture

Miscellaneous
 Black Sea Forum for Partnership and Dialogue, regional forum first held in 2006
 Hard bolívar, abbreviated BsF or Bs.F, the currency of Venezuela from 2008 to 2018
 Boysetsfire, an American post-hardcore rock band
 Bradshaw Army Airfield, with IATA airport code BSF
 British Standard Fine, an imperial-unit based screw-thread standard
 Building Schools for the Future, a British Government initiative to rebuild schools, from 2004 to 2010
 BSF (time service), Taiwan's time signal
 Segelföreningen i Björneborg, Finnish yacht club